Madakkayathra is a 1985 Indian Malayalam film, directed by George Vettam and produced by George Thankachan. The film has musical score by Alleppey Ranganath.

Cast

Soundtrack
The music was composed by Alleppey Ranganath and the lyrics were written by Bichu Thirumala.

References

External links
 

1985 films
1980s Malayalam-language films